

The Cierva C.29 was a five-seat British cabin autogyro built in 1934 as a joint venture between Westland Aircraft and Cierva. The rotor system and rotors were designed by Cierva and the fuselage by Westland. It was powered by a  Armstrong Siddeley Panther II engine with a two-bladed tractor propeller; the engine also drove the three-bladed rotor via a clutched shaft. The C.29 suffered from ground resonance during ground running and was not flown. It was later acquired for evaluation by the Royal Aircraft Establishment but it was unable to cure the resonance problem and the autogyro was scrapped in 1939.

Specifications

References

Notes

Bibliography

External links

C.29
C.29
1930s British civil utility aircraft
Single-engined tractor autogyros